Shrub lespedeza is a common name for several plants and may refer to:

Lespedeza bicolor, native to Asia
Lespedeza thunbergii, native to China and Japan